Tarzan the Tiger (1929) is a Universal movie serial based on the novel Tarzan and the Jewels of Opar by Edgar Rice Burroughs.  It stars Frank Merrill as Tarzan, Natalie Kingston as Jane, and Al Ferguson. It was directed by Henry MacRae.

It was once considered a lost film, but a copy has since been found. Today the serial is available on DVD and, in the public domain, available for download on the internet.

Synopsis
Lord Greystoke (Tarzan) returns to Africa, with Lady Jane and friend Albert Werper, in order to return to Opar. He needs the treasure of Opar in order to secure his estates in England. Werper, however, is actually interested in the gold itself.  He is in league with Arab slave trader Achmet Zek, who wishes revenge on Tarzan and Lady Jane for himself.

Cast
Frank Merrill as "The Lord of the Manor—known to London as the Earl of Greystoke—and to the Jungle as Tarzan, the Tiger!"
Frank Merrill reprised his role as Tarzan from Tarzan the Mighty. His performances in these two serials make him the last silent Tarzan and the first sound Tarzan. Merrill did his own stunts and devised the original Tarzan yell.
Natalie Kingston as "Lady Jane, his wife, who has left the gaiety of London Society to share his life on the Jungle plantation"
Natalie Kingston was again cast as the love interest but this time played the traditional character of Lady Jane instead of Mary Trevor (from Tarzan the Mighty). The change was not explained in the serial.
Al Ferguson as "Albert Werper, Soldier of Fortune—a guest at Greystoke Manor in the guise of a friendly scientist"
Al Ferguson was also again cast as the villain of the story, but not as the same character (or even a slightly renamed character, as with Jane. In Tarzan the Mighty he played the pirate Black John).
Kithnou as "The High Priestess of the Sun Worshipers—La, who has sworn that she will have no other mate than Tarzan"
Mademoiselle Kithnou was a dancer and actress of mixed Indian and European descent from Puducherry, at that time in French India, or possibly from Mauritius.
Sheldon Lewis as "Achmet Zek, a Nomad chief, against whose traffic in slaves Tarzan has waged relentless war"

Quoted text from the opening credits for each character.

Production
Tarzan the Tiger was a sequel based on the success of Tarzan the Mighty.

Advertising for the serial focused, in addition to the usual jungle serial perils (such as elephants, lions, tigers and gorillas), on the beautiful women (Lady Jane, La, and the women of the slave market scenes). Kingston, as Jane, appeared topless in a swimming sequence in chapter 8. "It is said that fathers sometimes accompanied their sons to the showings."

A further sequel, to create a trilogy of Frank Merrill Tarzan serials, was planned. The third entry would have been called Tarzan the Terrible. However, Merrill's voice was deemed unsuitable for sound films, and the sequel was cancelled. Merrill made personal appearances in costume to promote the serial. During these, he realized how much influence he had on children. Combined with the issues over his voice, this led him to retire after this serial and devote his life to children. He became a Recreational Director for the Parks commission of the Los Angeles city administration.

Tarzan the Tiger was a transitional film with one version released as a silent and the other with a partial soundtrack. The soundtrack consists mostly of only music and sound effects, but does include the first Tarzan yell, although it does not sound like the now-traditional call that was first used in the Johnny Weissmuller Tarzan movie Tarzan the Ape Man.

Chapter titles

Call of the Jungle
The Road to Opar
The Altar of the Flaming God
The Vengeance of La
Condemned to Death
Tantor the Terror
The Deadly Peril
Loop of Death
Flight of Werper
Prisoner of the Apes
The Jaws of Death
The Jewels of Opar
A Human Sacrifice
Tarzan's Rage
Tarzan's Triumph

See also
 Nudity in film

References

External links

          
ERBzine review of Tarzan the Tiger

Download or view online
 
 

1929 films
1929 adventure films
American adventure films
American black-and-white films
American sequel films
American silent serial films
1920s English-language films
Films based on American novels
Films directed by Henry MacRae
Films set in Africa
Tarzan films
Transitional sound films
Universal Pictures film serials
1920s rediscovered films
Rediscovered American films
1920s American films
Silent adventure films